Sweet Memorial Building is a historic village hall and auditorium located at Phoenix in Oswego County, New York.  It is "T" shaped structure built in 1929 in the Neoclassical style. It features a two-story cast stone portico surmounted by a cast stone pediment.  It stands as a memorial to Congressman Thaddeus Campbell Sweet (1872–1928), who helped to rebuild the village after a fire in 1916.

It was listed on the National Register of Historic Places in 1990.

References

External links
Sweet Memorial Building - Phoenix, New York - U.S. National Register of Historic Places on Waymarking.com

Government buildings on the National Register of Historic Places in New York (state)
Government buildings completed in 1929
Buildings and structures in Oswego County, New York
National Register of Historic Places in Oswego County, New York